Notholirion macrophyllum is a species of flowering plant in the lily family, Liliaceae. They are bulbous flowering plants originating in Asia. N. macrophyllum is the smallest species in the family, with a height of 20–25 cm. The leaves are basal, 30–40 cm long and about 2 cm wide. from June to August N. macrophyllum produces a racemose inflorescence bearing 2–4 (occasionally 6) pale violet to purple or red, bell-shaped, hermaphrodite, flowers with dark purple flecks in the throat, about 5 cm in length. After flowering the plant produces a capsular fruit.

Distribution 
The area of distribution includes Tibet, Nepal, Sichuan, Yunnan, Bhutan, and Sikkim, where it is found in oak forests, and on grassy slopes and meadows at altitudes from 2800 to 3400 m.

References

Bibliography 

 Stephen Haws: The Lilies of China, 1986, pp. 153–154, 

Liliaceae
Flora of Asia
Taxa named by Pierre Edmond Boissier
Taxa named by David Don